Mordechai Eliyahu Liebling (born October 29, 1948) is the director of the newly created Social Justice Organizing Program at the Reconstructionist Rabbinical College (RRC). He has worked throughout his career toward tikkun olam, repair of the world, and RRC’s program is the first Jewish seminary-based initiative to offer a specialized certificate in justice organizing for rabbis.

Liebling answered the calls for clergy to come to Ferguson, MO during the demonstrations, to Standing Rock to protest the building of the pipeline and was in Charlottesville, VA on the line facing the Alt-right.
 
Through his own experience, Liebling came to realize that spiritual leaders hold unique power to demonstrate and inspire ethical choices, and to lead a pursuit of justice fueled by caring rather than rage.

He served as the executive vice president of Jewish Funds for Justice; prior to that organization’s merger with The Shefa Fund, he held the title Torah of Money Director at TSF, providing guidance to help people apply Jewish laws and values to how they spend, invest and donate. For 12 years he was the executive director of the Jewish Reconstructionist Federation, and he later served there as senior consultant. Before entering the rabbinical program at RRC, he worked as a community organizer.

 
Liebling was a member of the Conference of Presidents of Major Jewish Organizations for 12 years. He has served on the boards of various national and international non-profit organizations. He serves on the boards of the Faith and Politics Institute and Rabbis for Human Rights-North America, and is the president emeritus of the Shalom Center.

 
He has received awards from the Reconstructionist Rabbinical Association, the Interfaith Center for Corporate Responsibility and Mazon. Liebling also has spoken out for justice for people with disabilities, and his family was the subject of the award-winning documentary film Praying With Lior.

 
He holds a Bachelor of Arts in government from Cornell University and Master of Arts in the history of American civilization, specializing in American progressive movements, from Brandeis University. Liebling is a 1985 graduate of RRC.
He has published articles in many publications, including Tikkun, Israel Horizons, Jewish Currents and The Reconstructionist.

He wrote a chapter entitled "The Odyssey (of a Jewish Man)" in the new book Brother Keepers: New Perspectives on Jewish Masculinity, in which he describes his personal spiritual journey.

He was married to Rabbi Devora Bartnoff Liebling (July 3, 1952 – April 30, 1997), who died age 44 after a two-year struggle with  breast cancer; he is now married to Lynne Iser.

Publications
“Making Synagogues Vessels of Tikkun Olam,” The Reconstructionist Volume 68, Number 1 (Fall 2003)
“Money in Synagogues,” Sh’ma March 2005 
“Tzedakah Collectives,” socialaction.com 
“The First Jewish Shareholder Activist Group,” greenmoneyjournal.com

References

External links
 http://www.rrc.edu
 https://www.youtube.com/rrcedu
 http://www.JewishJustice.org
 https://web.archive.org/web/20071214091542/http://www.dantrachtman.com/lior/

Living people
American Reconstructionist rabbis
1948 births
21st-century American rabbis